The Kraut Rocks are a group of rock outcrops on the snow-covered, lower southwest slopes of the Mount Berlin massif, in Marie Byrd Land, Antarctica. They were mapped by the United States Geological Survey from surveys and U.S. Navy air photos, 1959–66, and were named by the Advisory Committee on Antarctic Names for William F. Kraut, U.S. Navy, a radioman with the 1956 Army Navy Trail Party that traversed eastward from Little America V to establish Byrd Station.

References

Rock formations of Marie Byrd Land
Flood Range